ITVX (formerly ITV Hub) is a British online video-on-demand service operated by ITV. The service offers predominantly features content from ITV1, as well as ITV Digital channels and some licensed content. The service was known as ITV Player from its inception until 2015. On 23 November 2015, ITV gave the app (ITV Player) and the website (ITV.com) a revamp, it was renamed ITV Hub. , the service has at least 30 million registered users.

ITVX was rolled out on 17 November 2022, and it officially launched on 8 December. ITVX has substantially more exclusive programming than ITV Hub, positioning ITV's digital offering more in line with its competitors – the BBC and Channel Four Television Corporation. ITVX includes access to BritBox and a selection of FAST channels, which sees programmes such as The Chase and Hell's Kitchen have their own virtual linear channels. 

On 10 March 2023, it was confirmed that ITVX would become the new home of CITV content, called ITVX Kids, with the CITV brand being retired after 40 years.

History

The service started out as a website before being extended to television and other platforms. Initially, the website version used Microsoft Silverlight as opposed to Adobe Flash (used by BBC iPlayer and Channel 4's 4oD) and Windows Media Video. ITV adopted Flash for its player on 15 September 2009. In November 2009 the website was revamped again improving navigation as well as making the site more visually appealing. The service is free to use and funded by pre-, mid-, and post-roll adverts. Previously users have been able to use ad-blocking software to skip the adverts shown. In mid-2010 the ITV website was upgraded to detect ad-blocking software. Video is sent at multiple-bit rates and uses adaptive technology in the player to best determine the rate based on the user's connection. ITV Hub uses HTML5 Media Source Extensions with Encrypted Media Extensions to deliver video.

Improvements were made in June/July 2011 to the website version to incorporate subtitles and CITV programming. The redesigned website version was launched on 22 August 2011 and had upgraded search features, and a new Flash video player designed improve playback reliability. In January 2012, the site was due to be overhauled to offer paid-for content in addition to the existing free 30-day catch-up, however, this was delayed until 29 October 2012.

Content that has only aired on ITV (rather than also on ITV2, 3, 4, or CITV) is only available to viewers located in ITV plc regions (England, Wales, southern Scotland, the Channel Islands, the Isle of Man, and on UTV in Northern Ireland). If the same programme was also broadcast in central and northern Scotland, then users located in those areas may be able to view it on the STV Player. The ITV Hub website attempts to detect user location automatically, using that provided by the ISP. On 6 June 2016, ITV Hub replaced the UTV Player service in Northern Ireland, following the latter's sale to ITV plc in February 2016.

ITVX Premium 
ITV brought out a paid subscription service called ITV Hub+ which enables viewers to watch and download shows without adverts. Following the launch of ITVX, ITV Hub+ was combined with BritBox to form ITVX Premium.

Platforms

Television platforms

Sony Bravia
As of July 2017, ITV Hub is available on YouView-enabled Sony Bravia TVs.

BT TV
In December 2008, ITV Hub was added to BT TV's TV Replay service, the deal was ITV's first with a set-top-box VOD operator. It allows access to popular ITV1, ITV2, ITV3 and ITV4 shows up to 8 days after their transmission as well as a selection of archive shows.

Freesat
A place for a full version of ITV Player has been reserved on Freesat channel 903. A beta release was made available in December 2010 for Humax receivers, requiring the input of a code. The beta was made public on 26 July 2011, with support expected to be extended beyond Humax devices. On 31 July 2012, an update was released for Manhattan receivers which included support for ITV Player. In November 2012, both EchoStar and Samsung receivers also received ITV Player support.  Although the ITV Hub Player app is available to viewers around the UK on multiple platforms, it is not available to Freesat viewers using second generation Freesat receivers if their regional variation is set using postcodes starting DG or TD.  It is not clear why this contradiction exists.

Now TV / Roku
On 29 January 2014, ITV announced it would make ITV Player available on Sky's Now TV box. It was later made available on the NowTV and Roku devices on 11 June 2014.

Sky
On 30 January 2012, it was announced that ITV Player would be added to Sky's On Demand service the following day. ITV Player initially only offered archive content, with catch-up programming becoming available on 26 September.

Samsung Smart TV and Blu-ray players
On 6 July 2012, it was announced that ITV Player had been made available on Samsung's Smart TVs and Blu-ray players through their Samsung Smart TV service, for 2011 and later devices.

As of 8 December 2022, ITVX is only available on Samsung Smart TVs 2016 and above.

Virgin Media
On 8 January 2009, it was announced that ITV Net Player would be added to Virgin Media's digital cable TV service. The deal allows Virgin Media's 3.5 million TV customers to view over 40 hours of programming from ITV, ITV2, ITV3, and ITV4 each week. Popular shows such as Coronation Street and Emmerdale are all available for seven days after being broadcast as part of Virgin Media's free Catch up TV service. The service began a three-day deployment programme on 24 February 2009. Virgin Media's viewers were able to choose from 500 hours of ITV comedies, documentaries, and dramas, on demand through the TV Choice section, however, the contract to supply archive content ended on 23 February 2013.

YouView
ITV Player was one of four services available at the launch of YouView in July 2012. At launch, the ITV Player app contained options to resume watching recent programmes and browse by channel, day, and A-to-Z, but lacked integrated search and contained non-skippable adverts. During 2013, ITV intend to introduce paid-for content into ITV Player on YouView.

Games consoles

PlayStation 3
ITV Player was released on 14 December 2010 on PlayStation 3 via the PlayStation Network utilising the web-browser to distribute content rather than an app. It was free and ad-funded with pre-, mid-, and post-roll video ads being sold and served by ITV. Under the terms of the deal with Sony, STV, UTV and Channel Television were able to add their own equivalent services so they were also accessible from the PS3 platform on a similar basis to ITV Player. As of 29 May 2017 the service is no longer available on the PS3.

Xbox 360,Xbox One and Xbox Series S/X
ITV Hub was launched for Xbox One on Friday 10 February 2017, this was made possible by a new Universal Windows Platform app which integrates with Windows 10 and Xbox One. The STV Player app run by STV, who currently hold the ITV licence for Scotland, has been launched on Xbox 360. The STV Player app contains much of the content found on ITV Player and requires a Scottish postcode to be entered prior to use. ITV Hub Was launched on Xbox Series S/X on 10 November 2020

Mobile platforms

On 11 May 2011, ITV chief executive Adam Crozier announced that a dedicated ITV Player application would be released on a "wide range of mobiles and tablets" during 2011. The app features programming from ITV, ITV2, ITV3 and ITV4 for up to seven days after broadcast. However content is only available to view in the UK and ITV programming is blocked in the STV and UTV regions. A Wi-Fi connection is also required. The mobile apps were developed by digital agency Candyspace. During 2013, ITV intend to introduce paid-for content into ITV Player across all mobile platforms.

Android devices
An application for devices running Google's Android operating system was released on 20 June 2011. The app requires Android 2.2 (Froyo) or higher and Adobe AIR. Each show is broken up to feature non-skippable advert breaks. Users are forced to register an email address to use the app to allow ITV to "keep you informed about improvements and other exciting developments at ITV." On 14 January 2013, ITV Player 2.0 was released adding support for Android 3.x Gingerbread to 4.0 Ice Cream Sandwich and a re-engineered user interface.

Adobe ceased support for Flash on Android in 2011, which caused ITV Player to be incompatible with devices on that operating system. A new app was trialled but was only available on Samsung products and received poor reviews on Google Play Store. Upon the release of the app on 9 May 2013, Samsung entered into an exclusivity agreement with ITV, with the ITV Player app available exclusively on Samsung devices until 31 August. ITV's online product director, James Micklethwait, cited "fragmentation of the Android ecosystem" as the motive behind the deal.

ITVX is available on devices using Android 5.0 and above.

iOS devices
An application for Apple's iOS (iOS 4.3 or later) operating system and either the iPad (1st generation or later), iPhone (3GS or later) and iPod Touch (3rd generation or later), was launched on 1 July 2011.

In June 2013, the iOS app was updated to add a trial premium section, allowing subscribers to watch catch-up content without advertising, as well as pay to view live streams of ITV3 and ITV4. Early reviews of the updated app on the App Store were generally negative, with users commenting that the subscription option provided poor value for money.

Windows Phone
As of May 2014, the ITV Player has been released for Windows Phone which is just like the Android and iOS versions. However, the STV Player app run by STV, who currently hold the ITV licence for Scotland, has been launched on Windows Phone. Users of the STV Player can input their postcode to verify they live in Scotland, thus allowing users who are visiting other regions of the UK, to use the app and view content. The STV Player app contains much of the content found on ITV Player. As of January 2020, the ITV Hub is not supported on Windows Phone. The UWP app can only be installed on the Xbox One and videos cannot be played through Microsoft Edge whether you're in Mobile view or desktop view.

Streaming services

Amazon Prime Video

ITV offers most of its programming as part of ITV Catch Up subscription channel on the Prime Video platform.

Sponsorship
Since 6 March 2018, Domino's Pizza have sponsored ITVX (then ITV Hub), being the platform's first ever sponsor.

ITVX FAST channel line-up

Current
FAST channels featured on the service include:

Former

See also
 STV Player
 BritBox
 BBC iPlayer
 All 4
 My5
 List of streaming media services

References

External links
 

2008 establishments in the United Kingdom
British entertainment websites
Internet properties established in 2008
ITV (TV network)
Television websites
Video on demand services